Chodang University is the only university in Muan County, a largely rural district of South Korea's South Jeolla province.  The current president is Boung-Sik, Kim.

See also
List of colleges and universities in South Korea
Education in South Korea

References

External links
Official school website, in Korean
Official school website, in English

Universities and colleges in South Jeolla Province
Educational institutions established in 1994
1994 establishments in South Korea